Báb is a village and municipality in the Nitra District in western central Slovakia, in the Nitra Region.

History
The village was created in 1955 from the merger of two formerly independent villages, Malý Báb and Velký Báb. Veľký Báb was first mentioned in historical records in 1156 and Malý Báb in 1365.

Geography
The village lies at an altitude of 150 metres and covers an area of 20.091 km². It is located approximately 16 km west of Nitra.

Ethnicity
The village is approximately 99% Slovak.

Facilities
The village has a public library, a gym, and a football pitch.

Genealogical resources

The records for genealogical research are available at the state archive "Štátny Archív in Bratislava and Nitra, Slovakia"

 Roman Catholic church records (births/marriages/deaths): 1734-1896 (parish: B)
 Census records 1869 of Báb are not available at the state archive.

See also
 List of municipalities and towns in Slovakia

References

External links
 
 
https://web.archive.org/web/20071116010355/http://www.statistics.sk/mosmis/eng/run.html
Surnames of living people in Bab

Villages and municipalities in Nitra District